Sadama (Estonian for "Harbour") is a subdistrict in the district of Kesklinn (Midtown), Tallinn, the capital of Estonia. It has a population of 2,951.

Gallery

See also
Tallinn Passenger Port
Foorum

References

Subdistricts of Tallinn
Kesklinn, Tallinn